The 2014 Copa Libertadores Femenina was the sixth edition of the Copa Libertadores Femenina, South America's premier women's international club football tournament organized by CONMEBOL. The tournament was held in the city of São José dos Campos, in the state of São Paulo, Brazil, on 5–16 November 2014.

Hometown team São José were the defending champions and defended their title by beating Caracas FC in the final. It was the third title for the team which thus became the record champion of the competition.

The topscorer award was shared by three players with six goals: Andressa Alves, Diana Ospina and Ysaura Viso, who won the award for a second time.

Qualified teams
The competition was contested by twelve teams: the title holder, the champion club from each of the ten CONMEBOL associations, and one additional team from the host country Brazil.

Associations had to confirm team participation until 18 October and submit a player list until 25 October.

Format
Same format as last year is used:
The twelve teams are divided into three groups of four.
The group winners and the best runner-up advance to the semifinals.
The semifinals matchups are:
Group B winner vs. Best runner-up
Group C winner vs. Group A winner
The semifinal winners and losers play in the final and third place match respectively.

Referees
One referee and one assistant is sent from every CONMEBOL member association.

Prize money
Each association gets US$5,000 from CONMEBOL. Additionally there are prizes for associations of the top four teams. $5,000 for fourth, $10,000 for third, $15,000 for second and $20,000 for the champion's association.

Venues
Three venues are used: Estádio Martins Pereira (Group A, semi-finals, third place match and final), Estádio ADC GM (Group B), and Estádio ADC Parahyba (Group C). All matches had free entry to the public.

Group stage
The schedule was announced by CONMEBOL on 29 October 2014.

If teams finish level on points, order will be determined according to the following criteria:
 superior goal difference in all matches
 greater number of goals scored in all group matches
 better result in matches between tied teams
 drawing of lots

All times local, Brasília Summer Time (UTC−2).

Group A

Group B

Group C
Formas Íntimas advanced as best runners-up.

Knockout stage
If tied after regulation time, the penalty shoot-out is used to determine the winner (no extra time is played).

Semifinals

Third place match

Final
For the first time a team from Venezuela played in the final. For São José it was their third title in their third final.

Top goalscorers

References

External links
Copa Libertadores Femenina Brasil 2014, CONMEBOL.com

2014
2014 in women's association football
2014 in South American football
Lib
International club association football competitions hosted by Brazil
International women's association football competitions hosted by Brazil